Carex missouriensis is a species of sedge in the family Cyperaceae, native to the US states of Nebraska, Kansas, Iowa, Missouri, Illinois, and Indiana. It is typically found in swales in surviving patches of prairie.

References

missouriensis
Endemic flora of the United States
Flora of Nebraska
Flora of Kansas
Flora of Iowa
Flora of Missouri
Flora of Illinois
Flora of Indiana
Plants described in 2001